"Temporarily Yours" is a single by American country music artist Jeanne Pruett. Released in February 1980, and was the third single from the album Encore!.  The song reached #5 on the Billboard Hot Country Singles chart, becoming her biggest hit single on that chart since 1973's "Satin Sheets".

Charts

Weekly charts

Year-end charts

References 

1980 singles
Jeanne Pruett songs
Songs written by Sonny Throckmorton
1980 songs